Devario horai is a freshwater fish first described from hill streams in the Namdapha National Park in India.

References

Freshwater fish of India
Fish described in 1983
Devario